10th SFFCC Awards
December 11, 2011

Best Picture: 
 The Tree of Life 

The 10th San Francisco Film Critics Circle Awards, honoring the best in film for 2011, were given on 11 December 2011.

Winners

Best Picture:
The Tree of Life
Best Director:
Terrence Malick – The Tree of Life
Best Original Screenplay:
Margin Call – J. C. Chandor
Best Adapted Screenplay:
Tinker Tailor Soldier Spy – Bridget O'Connor and Peter Straughan
Best Actor:
Gary Oldman – Tinker Tailor Soldier Spy
Best Actress:
Tilda Swinton – We Need to Talk About Kevin
Best Supporting Actor:
Albert Brooks – Drive
Best Supporting Actress:
Vanessa Redgrave – Coriolanus
Best Animated Feature:
Rango
Best Foreign Language Film:
Certified Copy (Copie conforme) • France
Best Documentary:
Tabloid
Best Cinematography:
The Tree of Life – Emmanuel Lubezki
Marlon Riggs Award (for courage & vision in the Bay Area film community):
National Film Preservation Foundation, in recognition of for its work in the preservation and dissemination of endangered, culturally significant films
Special Citation (for under-appreciated independent cinema):
The Mill and the Cross

References
 San Francisco Film Critics Circle: “The Tree of Life” best picture
 San Francisco Film Critics Name Tree of Life Best Picture

External links
 2011 San Francisco Film Critics Circle Awards

San Francisco Film Critics Circle Awards
2011 film awards
December 2011 events in the United States
2011 in San Francisco